Emily Whitlock, (born 15 February 1994 in Macclesfield, England) is a professional squash player who represents Wales. She reached a career-high world ranking of World No. 12 in November, 2017.

Whitlock is one of the most talented young British players on the PSA World Tour and already has a vast array of Tour titles in her burgeoning career.

After making solid progress up the World Rankings, she captured three successive titles at the start of 2012 and repeated the feat at the end of the year.

Five titles followed in 2013 and 2014 before she lifted her first PSA Challenger 15 title at the Courtcare Open in May 2015.

Her performances there didn't go unnoticed and she joined the elite top 20 players in the world a month later.

References

External links 

English female squash players
Living people
1994 births
Sportspeople from Macclesfield